Limerick is a city in Ireland.

Limerick may also refer to:

Arts and entertainment
 Limerick (poetry),  a form of verse, often humorous and sometimes rude, in five-line, predominantly anapestic meter, with a strict rhyme scheme of AABBA
 Limerick (song), a traditional humorous drinking song with many obscene verses

Places

Ireland
County Limerick, Ireland, the county where the city Limerick is located

Canada
Limerick, Ontario
Limerick, Saskatchewan

United States
Limerick, Georgia
Limerick, Louisville, Kentucky
Limerick, Maine
Camanche, California, formerly Limerick
Limerick Township, Pennsylvania
Limerick Nuclear Power Plant
New Limerick, Maine
San Ramon, California, formerly Limerick

Constituencies

Before 1801
Askeaton (Parliament of Ireland constituency)
Kilmallock (Parliament of Ireland constituency)
Limerick City (Parliament of Ireland constituency)
Limerick County (Parliament of Ireland constituency)

1801–1885
Limerick City (UK Parliament constituency)
County Limerick (UK Parliament constituency)

1885–1922
Limerick City (UK Parliament constituency)
East Limerick (UK Parliament constituency)
West Limerick (UK Parliament constituency)

1921–1923
Kerry–Limerick West (Dáil constituency)
Limerick City–Limerick East (Dáil constituency)

1923–1948
Limerick (Dáil constituency)

1948–2011
Limerick East (Dáil constituency)
Limerick West (Dáil constituency)

2011–2016
Limerick (Dáil constituency)

2011–
Limerick City (Dáil constituency)

2016–
Limerick County (Dáil constituency)

People
Alison Limerick, British singer
Earl of Limerick, a British noble title
Patricia Nelson Limerick, American historian

Other uses
Limerick F.C., an Irish association football team
Limerick (horse), a New Zealand Thoroughbred race horse
Limerick lace, a variety of needle lace